Tetraopes varicornis is a species of beetle in the family Cerambycidae. It was described by Laporte in 1840. It is known from Mexico.

References

Tetraopini
Beetles described in 1840